Football 7-a-side at the 2000 Summer Paralympics consisted of a men's event with eight teams competing.

Medal summary

Group stage

Finals

References 
 

 
2000 Summer Paralympics events
2000